Kraszewice  is a village in Ostrzeszów County, Greater Poland Voivodeship, in west-central Poland. It is the seat of the gmina (administrative district) called Gmina Kraszewice.

The village has an approximate population of 1,600.

References

Kraszewice